Marble is an unincorporated community in northeastern Madison County, Arkansas, United States. The community is located on U.S. Route 412 and the southwest bank of the Kings River.

Marble was built up chiefly after the Civil War. The community was named for the valuable marble mined in the vicinity.

References

Unincorporated communities in Madison County, Arkansas
Unincorporated communities in Arkansas